Strömmer is a surname. Notable people with the surname include:

Åke Strömmer (1936–2005), Swedish sports journalist
Bertel Strömmer (1890–1962), Finnish architect
Gunnar Strömmer (born 1972), Swedish politician
Mia Strömmer (born 1974), Finnish female hammer thrower